Shotley Bridge railway station served the village of Shotley Bridge, County Durham, England from 1867 to 1953 on the Derwent Valley Railway.

History 
The station opened on 2 December 1867 by the North Eastern Railway. It was situated on the north side of the B6310. Nearby were worker's cottages and a goods yard. The station was closed to both passengers and goods traffic on 21 September 1953. The single platform remains along with the worker cottages but a closed toilet block now occupies what was the goods yard.

References

External links 

Disused railway stations in County Durham
Former North Eastern Railway (UK) stations
Railway stations in Great Britain opened in 1867
Railway stations in Great Britain closed in 1953
1867 establishments in England
1953 disestablishments in England
Consett